Pakistan competed at the 2008 Summer Olympics in Beijing, China. The country sent 21 athletes, including two women (Sadaf Siddiqui in athletics and Kiran Khan in swimming). The men's field hockey team comprised 16 players out of the Pakistani delegation.

Athletics

Men

Women

Key
Note–Ranks given for track events are within the athlete's heat only
Q = Qualified for the next round
q = Qualified for the next round as a fastest loser or, in field events, by position without achieving the qualifying target
NR = National record
N/A = Round not applicable for the event
Bye = Athlete not required to compete in round

Field hockey

Pakistan's men's team qualified for the 2008 Games. In the group play, they won two and lost three matches, finishing fourth in the group. This qualified them for a match against New Zealand for 7th/8th place, which they lost. The team's final ranking for the tournament was 8th.

Men's tournament

Roster

Group play

Shooting

Men

Swimming

Men

Women

See also
 Pakistan at the 2008 Summer Paralympics

References

External links
Kiran Khan Olympic profile
Siddiq Umar Olympic profile
Muhammad Sajjad Olympic profile
Sadaf Siddiqui Olympic profile

Nations at the 2008 Summer Olympics
2008 Summer Olympics
Olympics